Pharyngeal may refer to:

Anatomy
 Pharynx, for pharyngeal anatomy
 Pharyngeal muscles
Superior pharyngeal constrictor muscle
 Middle pharyngeal constrictor muscle
 Inferior pharyngeal constrictor muscle
 Pharyngeal artery
 Pharyngeal slit
 Pharyngeal tonsil, a mass of lymphoid tissue in the pharynx

Other
 Pharyngeal consonant, for pharyngeal sounds in phonetics

See also